Maggie is an American sitcom broadcast on ABC from October 24, 1981, to May 21, 1982.

Premise
Miriam Flynn stars as Maggie Weston, a Dayton, Ohio, housewife. Based on the humorous books of Erma Bombeck, this sitcom portrayed the life of a harried housewife, Maggie Weston, as she coped with her husband and her three children in the suburbs outside of Dayton, Ohio. L.J. was the 16-year-old son of the Westons who was referred to but never seen or heard on the program because he was always in the bathroom. Doris Roberts co-starred as Loretta, Maggie's friend and hairdresser.

Cast
 Miriam Flynn as Maggie Weston
 James Hampton as Len Weston
 Doris Roberts as Loretta Davenport
 Judith-Marie Bergan as Buffy Croft
 Margie Impert as Chris 
 Billy Jayne as Mark Weston
 Christian Jacobs as Bruce Weston

Episodes

External links
 

1981 American television series debuts
1982 American television series endings
1980s American sitcoms
English-language television shows
Television shows set in Dayton, Ohio
American Broadcasting Company original programming
Television shows based on books